Maria Grazia Roberti (born 10 December 1966) is an Italian female mountain runner and snowshoe runner, who won three World Snowshoe Championships.

Biography
Maria Grazia Roberti after a brilliant career in mountain running, crowned by several medals at the world and European championships (among them stands out two individual silver), arrived at the threshold of 40 years began to practice the snowshoe running by winning three golds and a bronze at the world championships, and if this discipline became Olympic at the 2018 Winter Olympics in Sochi, the Brescia champion could attend you at the age of 51.

Achievements
In mountain running she has participated in 16 World Championships (from 1989 to 2010) and 10 of the European Championships (1996 to 2012), winning 26 medals of which 2 at the individual level and 24 with the national team.

Team results
 World Mountain Running Championships (15 medals)
  1989, 1993, 1998, 1999, 2005, 2010 (6)
  1995, 1996, 1997, 2009 (4)
  1991, 1994, 2006, 2007, 2008 (5)
 4th: 1992
 European Mountain Running Championships (9 medals)
  1996, 1998, 2006, 2007, 2009, 2010 (6)
  2012 (1)
  1999, 2008 (2)
 5th: 1997

National titles
 Italian Mountain Running Championships
 Mountain running: 1997, 2006 (2)
 Italian Long Distance Mountain Running Championships
 Long distance mountain running: 2008, 2010, 2012 (3)

See also
 Italy at the European Mountain Running Championships
 Italy at the World Mountain Running Championships

References

External links
 
 Maria Grazia Roberti profile at Gruppo Sportivo Forestale

1966 births
Living people
Italian female long-distance runners
Italian female mountain runners
Snowshoe runners
Athletics competitors of Gruppo Sportivo Forestale
Sportspeople from the Province of Brescia